Mohammed Ibrahim Baloch (or Bloch; born 1949), better known as Mehul Kumar, is an Indian filmmaker and writer in Bollywood. He is known for directing the films Tirangaa (1992), Krantiveer (1993) and Kohram (1999). His other works include Mrityudaata (1997) and Kitne Door Kitne Paas (2002) among others as well as several Gujarati films.

Early life and work
Mehul Kumar was born as Mohammed Baloch into a Makrani Baloch family in the city of Jamnagar, Gujarat in 1949. Graduating from Bombay University he started as a journalist during the early 1970s which included writing film reviews. He then moved to work in Gujarati theatre.

Career
His first work in films was as an assistant director to Chandrakant Sangani and then with Aamir Khan's father Tahir Hussain. He made his directorial debut with a Gujarati comedy Chandu Jamadar (1977), a remake of Dada Kondke's highly successful lowbrow Marathi comedy Pandu Havaldar (1975). Though it was Kumar's 1977 bilingual Hindi-Gujrati film Janam Janam Na Saath (Gujarati)/Phir Janam Lenge Hum (Hindi) produced by Tahir Hussain which first gained recognition. After its success, Kumar directed eighteen successful Gujarati films over the years.

Kumar then made his second Hindi project Anokha Bandhan (1982). After that he directed films with actors like Dharmendra, Jeetendra, Anil Kapoor, Meenakshi Sheshadri, Shabana Azmi, Madhuri Dixit, Shatrughan Sinha, Mehmood and Feroz Khan among others.

Then came Kumar's blockbuster golden jubilee hit Marte Dam Tak (1987) which starred Raaj Kumar, Govinda and Farah. Jungbaaz, Nafrat Ki Aandhi and a string of back-to-back films followed in the 1980s. In the '90s he made commercially successful films like Tirangaa (1992) starring Raaj Kumar and Nana Patekar. Then followed Krantiveer (1993) based on the Bombay riots. Krantiveer was a box-office hit with Patekar winning a National Film Award for his performance.

Kumar then directed ABCL's debut venture Mrityudaata (1997) which was Amitabh Bachan's comeback film after five years, but it emerged as a box-office failure. He brought Nana Patekar and Amitabh Bachchan together in Kohram (1999). Although it was commercially unsuccessful as well, it is remembered for the performances of its lead actors. He then made Kitne Door Kitne Paas (2002), which fared well. His next film Jaago (2004) was based on a real life incident and was one of the first films to raise awareness about rape in India. His last film was Krantiveer: The Revolution (2010) starred his daughter Jahan Bloch in the lead role and was a sequel to Krantiveer.

He has also produced some of his films like Tirangaa, Krantiveer, Kohram and Jaago. Other actors which have appeared and collaborated with Kumar on film projects include Dimple Kapadia, Naseeruddin Shah, Akshay Kumar, Raveena Tandon and Karisma Kapoor.

Personal life and family
Kumar runs Mehul Cinemax, a film theatre in Jamnagar owned by his production company Mehul Entertainments Private Limited.

His brother Hussain Bloch is a film director in Gujarati cinema and has also worked with Kumar in many of his films. Kumar's daughter Jahan Bloch appeared as the lead in Krantiveer'''s sequel Krantiveer: The Revolution'' (2010). She had previously appeared as a child actress in his films. Having since moved to Prince Edward's Island with her chef husband, she now runs a bakery while also working as a filmmaker. His son Zoheb Mohammed Bloch has assisted Kumar as a director in films. He has another daughter Shameem Khan, a costume designer, and a brother production manager Mohamed Bloch; both of whom have worked with Kumar on his films.

The family uses the unusual spelling of Bloch for their surname, which is usually spelt as Baloch.

Filmography

See also
 Makrani caste
 Baloch people in India

References

External links

Gujarati-language film directors
Hindi-language film directors
Living people
1949 births
20th-century Indian film directors
21st-century Indian film directors
Film directors from Mumbai
Indian people of Baloch descent
Gujarati people